Halter Creek is a  tributary of the Frankstown Branch of the Juniata River in Bedford and Blair counties, Pennsylvania, in the United States.

It originates at Bakers Summit in Bedford County east of Dunning Mountain. It flows northward through Roaring Spring, and then through McKee Gap between Dunning Mountain and Short Mountain.  It flows into the Frankstown Branch south of Newry.

See also
List of rivers of Pennsylvania

References

Rivers of Pennsylvania
Tributaries of the Juniata River
Rivers of Bedford County, Pennsylvania
Rivers of Blair County, Pennsylvania